

This is a list of the National Register of Historic Places listings in Sandusky, Ohio.

This is intended to be a complete list of the properties and districts on the National Register of Historic Places in Sandusky, Ohio, United States. Latitude and longitude coordinates are provided for many National Register properties and districts; these locations may be seen together in an online map.

There are 178 properties and districts listed on the National Register in Erie County, including 2 National Historic Landmarks. The city of Sandusky is the location of 114 of these properties and districts; they are listed here, while the remaining 64 sites, including both National Historic Landmarks, are listed separately. Another 3 properties were once listed but have been removed.

Current listings

|}

Former listings

|}

See also

 List of National Historic Landmarks in Ohio
 National Register of Historic Places listings in Ohio

References

 Sandusky
 
Sandusky